Norridgewock is a census-designated place (CDP) in the town of Norridgewock in Somerset County, Maine, United States. The population was 1,557 at the 2000 census.

Geography
Norridgewock is located at  (44.715907, −69.791083).

According to the United States Census Bureau, the CDP has a total area of 11.2 square miles (29.0 km), of which, 10.7 square miles (27.8 km) of it is land and 0.5 square miles (1.2 km) of it (4.20%) is water.

Demographics

As of the census of 2000, there were 1,557 people, 602 households, and 455 families residing in the CDP. The racial makeup of the CDP was 97.82% White, 0.19% Black or African American, 0.71% Native American, 0.13% Asian, 0.39% from other races, and 0.77% from two or more races. Hispanic or Latino of any race were 0.32% of the population.

There were 602 households, out of which 37.2% had children under the age of 18 living with them, 58.6% were married couples living together, 11.0% had a female householder with no husband present, and 24.4% were non-families. 17.4% of all households were made up of individuals, and 6.6% had someone living alone who was 65 years of age or older. The average household size was 2.59 and the average family size was 2.90.

In the CDP, the population was spread out, with 27.0% under the age of 18, 7.2% from 18 to 24, 28.6% from 25 to 44, 25.2% from 45 to 64, and 11.9% who were 65 years of age or older. The median age was 37 years. For every 100 females, there were 97.6 males. For every 100 females age 18 and over, there were 92.5 males.

The median income for a household in the CDP was $31,458, and the median income for a family was $36,161. Males had a median income of $30,976 versus $19,957 for females. The per capita income for the CDP was $16,577. About 18.9% of families and 21.6% of the population were below the poverty line, including 33.8% of those under age 18 and 14.1% of those age 65 or over.

References

Census-designated places in Maine
Census-designated places in Somerset County, Maine
Norridgewock, Maine